The 1881 Suburbs of Nelson by-election was a by-election held  on 11 January 1881 in the  electorate in Nelson during the 7th New Zealand Parliament.

The by-election was caused by the death of the incumbent Andrew Richmond, on 15 November 1880. The by-election was won by Arthur Collins. Collins was opposed by Arthur Harley, described as a young man with radical ideas like abolishing the governor and the legislative council and issuing a paper currency. Harley was said to be all for "smashing and wasting" and to out-Greys Grey in his Greyism! So it was a fight between "Communism and Constitutionalism".

Results

References 

 

Nelson Suburbs 1881
1881 elections in New Zealand
January 1881 events
Politics of the Nelson Region